The River & Rowing Museum in Henley-on-Thames, Oxfordshire, England, is located on a site at Mill Meadows by the River Thames. It has three main themes represented by major permanent galleries, the non-tidal River Thames, the international sport of rowing and the local town of Henley-on-Thames.

History
The impetus for the museum largely came from David Lunn-Rockliffe, formerly Executive Secretary of the Amateur Rowing Association.
The building was designed by the modernist architect Sir David Chipperfield and has won awards for the building itself, including the Royal Fine Art Commission Building of the Year award in 1999. It was also UK National Heritage Museum of the Year in 1999.

It was officially opened in November 1998 by Queen Elizabeth II. Major benefactors include The Arbib Foundation run by local businessmen Sir Martyn Arbib and Urs Schwarzenbach. There was a 1998 opening exhibition of Julian Trevelyan 'River Thames' etchings.
 
In 2004, a Wind in the Willows attraction for families was installed. This is a walk-through recreation using models, sets and an audio-guide of all the E.H. Shepard illustrations from the Kenneth Grahame book.

In 2006, the museum completed an extensive refurbishment of its Rowing Gallery, thanks to a major donation by Urs Schwarzenbach. Now known as the Schwarzenbach International Rowing Gallery, it tells the story of rowing from its beginnings in ancient Greece to the modern Olympics. Thematically arranged the gallery includes sections devoted to the Oxford v. Cambridge Boat Race, World & Olympic rowing, professional rowing in the 19th and early 20th centuries, boat building, coaching and nutrition. The museum now displays a unique collection of video clips. A feature in the Schwarzenbach International Rowing Gallery is an interactive exhibit In the Cox's Seat that allows visitors to sit in a rowing boat and experience a race at Henley Royal Regatta

Temporary exhibitions have included work by the Thames-based painter Chris Gollon, the local 20th-century artist John Piper:  'The Master of Diversity in Association with Bohun Gallery and the Michael Gyselynck John Piper Collection, one of his collaborators, the potter Geoffrey Eastop, the local painter Nick Schlee, and the local furniture maker Philip Koomen. In 2006, there was an exhibition by John Piper's grandson, Luke Piper. Between November 2006 and February 2007, there was an exhibition of the illustrations of E.H. Shepard called The Man who Drew Pooh & Toad.

The museum was one of the first to have a website, which existed before the building opened.

Themes
The Museum includes four themes explored through a wide variety of exhibitions and events across four galleries and special exhibitions:

 The past, present and future of the River Thames
 The historic riverside community of Henley on Thames
 The international sport of rowing
 The Wind in the Willows

Galleries

The Wind in the Willows Gallery
The permanent Wind in the Willows exhibition includes Mr Toad, Ratty, Badger, and Mole to a location on the bank of the River Thames, whose creatures and landscapes provided the inspiration behind the original book.

E.H. Shepard’s illustrations are included as 3-D models that depict the adventures of Mr Toad, Ratty, and their friends. The Museum has rights to use the original images by Shepard, who explored the meadows and willow-fringed river around nearby Pangbourne in search of settings for these illustrations. The exhibition follows the original storyline, using theatrical lighting and sound techniques to take visitors on a journey through the world of The Wind in the Willows. Interactive exhibits and specially developed audio guides help visitors feel a part of the story.

Thames Gallery
The Thames Gallery is the largest of the River & Rowing Museum's permanent galleries. It provides an interpretation of the River Thames from source to sea. The River Thames is a key element of life in the Thames Valley and the country as a whole. The gallery offers visitors a range of perspectives, looking at the river as an inspiration for the arts, as a natural habitat for wildlife and as both a source of pleasure and a means of trade. In a mix of music, art, photography, original objects, boats and oral testimony the gallery takes the visitor on a journey from the source at Kemble to the Thames Barrier. Exhibits from local and private collections illustrate the historic and social importance of the river, while interactive displays enable visitors to learn more about river management and water supply.

Aspects of the Thames in the exhibition include:

 Travel from the hidden source to the sea
 Thames paintings in the gallery and on terminals
 The wildlife and the bugs that make their home in and alongside the river
 Music, poetry and literature inspired by the Thames, from Conrad to The Kinks
 The craftsmanship of boat builders from log boats to skiffs and punts
 How the Thames has been managed throughout the ages
 The importance of weirs, locks and bridges and meet some of their custodians
 Stories told by members of riverside communities

Schwarzenbach International Rowing Gallery

There is a contemporary painting by the entrance, Gollon At Henley, painted by Chris Gollon and commissioned by the River & Rowing Museum in 2008. The image shows a defeated crew at Henley Royal Regatta. Inside the gallery, the story of international rowing is presented, allowing the visitor to experience the sport and understand what it is like to compete on the water.

Rowing is one of the world's oldest sports and the gallery tells its story in detail. On display are many objects no previously shown in public, film footage showing races, and a range of interactive exhibits of general interest. Sections include exhibits on the following:

 Six communities who relied on the oar for their livelihood
 A race at the Henley Royal Regatta in 360° panoramic vision
 Rowing across the world, and throughout the centuries
 Races at the Olympics, Boat Race, etc.
 Professional rowers, sports stars of their day
 Coaches and boat builders whose work has allowed champions to flourish
 Racing craft spanning 200 years of design and innovation

Invesco Perpetual Henley Gallery
The Invesco Perpetual Henley Gallery tells the story of the town of Henley-on-Thames, built by the river. The history presented covers industry, arts, the Civil War, sports, etc. An interactive touch-screen allows visitors to take a virtual tour around the streets of Henley, travel back through time to when the town was established, see how it has changed over time, and how it became famous for rowing.

The Museum acquired an Iron Age coin hoard in 2009. It is made up of 32 gold coins dating from approximately 50 AD. It was found in Henley in 2003 and is the only hoard of British-made Iron Age coins from Oxfordshire to have survived intact. They have been acquired jointly by the River & Rowing Museum and the Ashmolean Museum in Oxford.

Henley was established in the 12th century when its location by the river made it convenient as an inland port for shipping timber, grain, and firewood to the rapidly growing city of London. From this time onwards, the town's fortunes were linked to the river and transport. Boats, stagecoaches, railway engines and motors have in turn brought goods and people to the town for business and pleasure.
 
Henley Royal Regatta has made the town of Henley-on-Thames an international centre of rowing. Established in 1839, and gaining a royal patron in 1851, the Regatta brings together leading international oarsmen and women and is considered to be part of the English social calendar. Town and Regatta celebrations since 1899 are presented on film in the gallery.

Painted in 1698 by the Dutch master Jan Siberechts (1627–c.1703), Henley from the Wargrave Road has its own room off the Henley Gallery. A masterpiece displaying the multifaceted life of the town and surrounding countryside, it is one of a series of English landscapes by Siberechts, The painting is a record of social history, showing the river trade, agriculture, and social hierarchy, alongside a still familiar view of the town. Henley from the Wargrave Road was purchased with the assistance of the National Art Collections Fund and the Heritage Lottery Fund.

Special exhibitions
Treasures Gallery, Sir Graham Kirkham Gallery, and The Wall provide venues for special exhibitions throughout the year. The Museum's exhibition programme is designed around its major themes and includes exhibitions that have a family appeal as well as more specialist exhibitions. Topics range from celebrations of major events and anniversaries to arts, crafts, and sculpture or in-depth investigations.

References

External links

 River and Rowing Museum
 American Friends of the River & Rowing Museum
 Original website
 1998 website

1998 establishments in England
Museums established in 1998
Sports museums in England
Museums in Oxfordshire
Maritime museums in England
Rowing on the River Thames
History of rowing
Museums on the River Thames
Local museums in Oxfordshire
David Chipperfield buildings
Henley-on-Thames